The 1979 Connecticut Huskies baseball team represented the University of Connecticut in the 1979 NCAA Division I baseball season. The Huskies were led by Larry Panciera in his 18th and final year as head coach, and played as part of the Eastern College Athletic Conference, a collection of northeastern universities with no other conference affiliation. Connecticut posted a 31–13 record, won the ECAC, and reached the 1979 College World Series, their fifth appearance in the penultimate college baseball event. The Huskies lost both games in the College World Series, being eliminated by eventual champion Cal State Fullerton.

Roster

Schedule

References 

Connecticut
UConn Huskies baseball seasons
College World Series seasons
1979 in sports in Connecticut